Whistle Labs Inc. is a subsidiary of Mars Petcare headquartered in San Francisco, California. It produces and markets the Whistle GPS Pet Tracker, a device worn on a pet's collar that monitors its activity and location. In addition to pet owners, the devices have been used by veterinary researchers.

Corporate history
The idea for Whistle grew out of current CEO Ben Jacobs' experiences on pet-care accounts at Bain & Company, and was developed with COO Steve Eidelman while researching the pet-care industry for venture capital firm DCM. They hired Kevin Lloyd as CTO and the three founded Whistle in 2012. The company started with 20 employees and raised $6 million in a venture funding round led by DCM. Other investors included the former CEO of Mars Petcare and the President of Humane Society Silicon Valley.

Whistle's first product, an activity monitor for dogs that tracked their exercise, was released in 2013. The company raised an additional $10 million in a Series A funding round and $15 million in Series B. A February 2014 agreement with PetSmart placed the Whistle device in all the company's stores and led to co-marketing efforts. Whistle also began working with veterinary schools to analyze the data collected from the app. For example, in 2014 the Pennsylvania School of Veterinary Medicine at the University of Pennsylvania used data from Whistle devices for their research on chronic pain conditions in dogs; and researchers at the College of Veterinary Medicine at North Carolina State University have used it to study epilepsy in dogs. The company also has an advisory panel of veterinarians.

Whistle began experimenting with the SigFox internet of things network for its devices in May 2014. In January 2015, the company acquired Tagg, a competing startup based in San Diego, for an undisclosed sum for its battery life and location-tracking intellectual property, and Tagg's CEO, Scott Neuberger, joined Whistle. Tagg had started as a Qualcomm subsidiary in 2010 and released its tracking device one year before Whistle. By 2015, Whistle had distributed 100,000 devices and had about 40 employees.

In April 2016, Whistle was acquired by Mars Petcare, the pet product subsidiary of the food and candy bar maker Mars, for $117 million.

Products

Whistle produces and markets wearable monitoring devices for pets. The Whistle Activity Monitor, which is sometimes called a "Fitbit for dogs", tracks the duration, time, and intensity of a pet's exercise, then gives the data to users over Wi-Fi networks or to a phone app using Bluetooth. The GPS pet tracker is for finding lost pets. It also produces an alert if the pet's behavior changes, for example a reduction in sleep, indicating anxiety.

The GPS and location tracking product was announced in May 2014. An integration with Jawbone Up that May allowed Jawbone users to compare their exercise to their dog's in the same app. In February 2017, Whistle 3 was introduced. It is half the size of prior models and intended for smaller dogs or cats.

Whistle started with a model called Whistle 3. They released Whistle GO in 2019. Whistle GO is an earlier version of the Whistle brand but is an improvement of the Whistle 3. Its main features are GPS locations tracking, and health and fitness monitoring. Whistle GO has an improved battery life and provides more health information than its previous model.

References

External links
 Official website

Pet equipment
Companies based in San Francisco
American companies established in 2012
Mars, Incorporated
2016 mergers and acquisitions
American corporate subsidiaries